The University of St. Thomas (also known as UST or simply St. Thomas) is a private, Catholic university in St. Paul and Minneapolis, Minnesota. Founded in 1885 as a Catholic seminary, it is named after Thomas Aquinas, the medieval Catholic theologian and philosopher who is the patron saint of students. As of fall 2021, St. Thomas enrolls nearly 9,347 students, making it Minnesota's largest private, nonprofit university.

History
Founded in 1885 by John Ireland, archbishop of Saint Paul and Minneapolis, St. Thomas began as an all-male, Catholic seminary. In 1894, the liberal arts program became an independent college through a gift from local railroad tycoon James J. Hill, who provided funds to establish the Saint Paul Seminary apart from the college. In 1903, the College of St. Thomas established a military program on campus, and it was officially termed a military school by the U.S. War Department in 1906. Initially, the school gave out two-year diplomas in commercial and classical programs before awarding its first academic degrees in 1915. In 1922, military training became optional.

From the late 1920s through the mid-1930s, the Holy Cross Fathers, who run the University of Notre Dame, controlled the college's administration. The diocese called those priests in to help with the school's financial problems; those priests were known as a crisis intervention team of sorts for parochial schools of that time. During World War II, St. Thomas served as a training base for naval officers, which kept the school open when men who would have attended college were fighting in the war. After the war, in 1948, the college established "Tom Town" on the eastern end of the lower quadrant, which is currently the site to the O'Shaughnessey-Frey Library and O'Shaughnessey Education Center. Tom Town, made of 20 double-dwelling huts, consisted of white, barracks-like housing units for faculty, students, and their families. The units helped to meet housing demand after World War II.

In the latter half of the 20th century, St. Thomas started two of its most notable graduate programs, education in 1950 and business administration in 1974. The school became co-educational in 1977, and although women were not allowed to enroll until then, female students from St. Catherine University (then the College of St. Catherine) often took classes at St. Thomas. Women were also present as instructors and administrators on campus, but the staff, faculty, and administration have seen a vast increase in female employment since the move to co-education. In 1990, the College of St. Thomas became the University of St. Thomas and the following year, the university opened the Minneapolis campus. In 2001, St. Thomas reinstated its School of Law at its Minneapolis campus; it had been shut down during the Great Depression. U.S. Supreme Court Justice Antonin Scalia was the speaker at the grand opening.

Campuses

Saint Paul

The St. Paul campus is the main campus and is home to most undergraduate students. The main campus, built on a farm site once considered "far removed from town", is located where St. Paul's Summit Avenue meets the Mississippi River. The site was farmed by ex-Fort Snelling soldier William Finn, who received the property as a pension settlement after he accidentally shot himself in the hand while on guard duty.

The western edge of the campus borders the Mississippi Gorge Regional Park. Summit Avenue, which runs through the middle of the campus, is the country's longest span of Victorian homes. This tree-lined avenue includes the Governor's Mansion, F. Scott Fitzgerald's townhome, and James J. Hill's mansion.

In 2005, a new apartment-style residence hall was built on an existing parking lot. McNeely Hall was also built the following year. It is a large classroom building for business that replaced the smaller building of the same name. A new residential village, more parking ramps, and general planning all have been negotiated successfully with the surrounding neighborhood. These developments are expected to begin within the next five years.

In early 2012, St. Thomas completed the final stage of its three-building expansion on the St. Paul campus. The two main additions that were completed are the Anderson Athletic and Recreation Center (AARC) and the Anderson Student Center. These projects were completed in the summer of 2010 and January 2012, respectively. The Anderson Athletic and Recreation Center has a field house, basketball arena, weight room, and swimming pool. The track in the field house is home to the most dominant track team in the MIAC conference. Other St. Thomas sports that use the AARC's facilities have also had recent success, including a playoff run for the football team, and a national championship for the men's basketball team. The new Anderson Student Center is home to new food venues, as well as entertainment options, including a game room and bowling alley, and a coffee shop. An art gallery on the second floor is home to the American Museum of Asmat Art.

St Thomas' newest dormitories, Frey Residence Hall and Tommie North Residence Hall, opened on north campus in 2020. Frey Residence Hall is a 5-story facility which houses 260 second-year and transfer students. Tommie North is also a 5-story facility, houses 480 residents and has a 116-stall underground parking ramp. It is connected to the Iverson Center for Faith and Ireland Hall via tunnel and sits on the site of the former John Paul II dormitory.

In 2021, St. Thomas moved forward with plans for a new $100 million building on South Campus called Schoenecker Center. The 130,000 square foot facility is scheduled to open in 2024 and will focus on STEAM fields. The 126-year-old Loras Hall, most recently used as an administrative building, was demolished to make way for Schoenecker Center.

In 2023, the university announced plans for a $175 million on-campus indoor arena known as Lee and Penny Anderson Arena. The 6,000-seat arena is planned to be the home of the basketball and hockey teams in addition to hosting other events such as commencement. Cretin Hall, McCarthy Gymnasium and the Service Center are to be demolished to make way for the arena.

Minneapolis

In fall 1992, the university opened a permanent  campus at 1000 LaSalle Ave. in Minneapolis. The first building, named Terrence Murphy Hall in May 2000, is headquarters to the university's Opus College of Business. Artist Mark Balma created one of the largest frescoes in the United States on the arched ceiling of its atrium. The seven-panel,  fresco was completed in the summer of 1994 and portrays the seven virtues discussed in the writings of St. Thomas Aquinas. The Minneapolis campus also holds St. Thomas' School of Education, the School of Law, and Schulze School of Entrepreneurship.

Daniel C. Gainey Conference Center (Owatonna)
As announced on May 15, 2014, the Daniel C. Gainey Conference Center was to be sold to Meridian Behavioral Health, LLC, with a plan to convert it to a treatment facility for addiction and behavioral disorders.  The deal closed in August 2014.  
The deal included the entire 180-acre property and all the buildings except for the Winton Guest House, which was designed by architect Frank Gehry. St. Thomas then sold the house at auction and it was moved from the site.

Bernardi (Rome)
Since 1999, the University of St. Thomas has been the only university in the United States to have a formal affiliation with the Pontifical University of St. Thomas Aquinas (Angelicum).

Academics
Each year, the university awards almost 2,500 degrees, including five different bachelor's degrees (B.A., B.M., B.S., B.S.M.E. and B.S.E.E.). It has 88 major fields at the undergraduate level, with 59 minor fields of study and seven preprofessional programs. At the graduate and professional level, the university offers 41 master's degrees, two education specialist degree, one juris doctor, and five doctorates.

Schools and colleges

The university offers its degree programs through nine divisions. The College of Arts and Sciences includes undergraduate departments in the arts, humanities, natural sciences, and social sciences, plus a number of interdisciplinary programs. The Opus College of Business has seven departments offering graduate and undergraduate curricula including Executive Education and Professional Development at University of St. Thomas, and is one of six AACSB accredited business schools in Minnesota. St. Thomas also houses the Saint Paul Seminary School of Divinity, which offers master's- and doctoral-level degrees oriented to theological study and the practice of ministry. Saint John Vianney Seminary, a minor college seminary, is also at St. Thomas. Other schools include the School of Education, the School of Engineering, and the School of Social Work. The Master of Social Work is offered as a double degree program with the St. Catherine University.

Schools housed on the Minneapolis campus include the Graduate School of Professional Psychology, Undergraduate and Graduate Schools of Education, Graduate Programs in Software Engineering, and the School of Law, which was re-opened in 1999 after a 66-year hiatus.

The University of St. Thomas is a member of the Associated Colleges of the Twin Cities (ACTC), a consortium of five private liberal arts colleges. This program allows students to take classes at one of the associated colleges for no additional cost. Other schools include Hamline University, St. Catherine University, Macalester College, and Augsburg University.

In 2017, St. Thomas was named a Changemaker Campus by joining AshokaU, a higher education consortium that focuses on social innovation in higher education.

Athletics

St. Thomas's school colors are purple and gray, and the athletic teams are called the Tommies. The mascot for these teams is "Tommie". "Tommy" was changed to the "ie" spelling when women were accepted as full-time students, to be more inclusive.

For most of its athletic history, St. Thomas was a member of the Minnesota Intercollegiate Athletic Conference (MIAC), which performs at the NCAA Division III level. Since 1885, athletics have been present on St. Thomas' campus. The first sports teams that became popular were intramural. The top intramural baseball teams in the 1890s were the "Blues" and "Grays", which is where the school colors come from. Varsity sports did not begin until 1904, and UST was a founding member of the MIAC in 1920. St. Thomas celebrated its 100th year of varsity athletics in 2003–2004.

St. Thomas' longtime archrival was Saint John's University from Collegeville, Minnesota. Recent national titles include men's basketball in 2011 and 2016; men's baseball in 2009 and 2001; women's softball in 2005 and 2004; men's lacrosse (MCLA Division II) in 2019, 2016, 2013, 2012, 2010 and 2009; women's volleyball in 2012; and dance team in 2017, 2016, 2015, 2014, 2013, 2012, 2011, 2010, 2008 and 2006. St. Thomas also won national championships with women's basketball in 1991; men's cross country in 1986 and 1984; men's indoor track in 1985; and women's cross country in 1987, 1986, 1984 and 1982.  In 2012, St. Thomas played for the first time in the Stagg Bowl in Salem, Virginia, which is the Division III Football National Championship game, against the University of Mount Union, losing 28-10. In 2015, St. Thomas reached the Stagg Bowl for the second time, prompting another championship match against Mount Union. St. Thomas ultimately ended up losing the game, with a final score of 49-35.

WCCO has broadcast radio coverage of Tommies football games since 2011.

On May 22, 2019 it was announced that St. Thomas was "involuntarily removed" from the MIAC. St. Thomas was to have been allowed to remain as a member of the conference until the spring of 2021 while they searched for a new conference had that become necessary but would be allowed to leave at an earlier date should a new conference accept them prior to spring 2021 or should they have decided to become an independent. On October 4, 2019, St. Thomas announced that it had been invited to the Summit League, an NCAA Division I conference. This announcement also noted that St. Thomas had applied for a waiver from the NCAA to move directly from Division III to Division I beginning with the 2021-22 season. While the process of transitioning from Division III to Division I normally takes 12 years and requires transitioning through Division II, on July 15, 2020, the NCAA announced they had approved St. Thomas's application to move directly to Division I. As the Summit League does not sponsor football or ice hockey, St. Thomas joined the Pioneer Football League for football, the CCHA for men's hockey and the WCHA for women's hockey.

Student life

Student housing

Undergraduate housing is found on the St. Paul Campus. Approximately 2,400 residents live in 10 traditional halls and apartments. Additionally, St. John Vianney College Seminary holds approximately 140 students. All but one (Murrary Herrick) traditional halls are single-sex, while apartment residences are co-ed by floor. Residence halls on campus are named after Archbishops of St. Paul-Minneapolis, such as William O. Brady, Austin Dowling, and John Ireland. The all-female traditional hall of John Paul II is named after the former Pope. Built in 1894, Cretin Hall is the oldest hall on campus and was designed (along with Loras and Grace halls) by Emmanuel Louis Masqueray.

Recently the department of residence life has purchased additional buildings on what they are calling 'mid-campus' in the area between Grand and Summit Avenues. These buildings house men and women transfer students in one of two buildings, separated by gender. There are two apartment complexes that are specifically designed for sophomores. Students are also housed in the residence above the Child Development Center, a day-care facility on campus.

The University of St. Thomas offers special interest floors, or floors that are intended to house specific residents with similar interests or class standing. Almost one-third of all floors are First Year Experience floors, which consist of only freshmen. This practice attempts to create a cohesive community by placing students together who will have a similar experience. First year students have the opportunity to participate in Living Learning Communities (LLCs). These include Sustainability, Aquinas Scholars, Tommies Do Well(ness), Pathways to Engineering, COJO MOJO, Bridging Divides, Catholic Studies, Major Explorers, and Business for the Common Good.

Undergraduate Student Government
The on-campus student association is the Undergraduate Student Government (USG), formerly known as the ACC. The student government is made up of an executive board and general council. Each executive board member receives a stipend. The executive board consists of the president of the student body, executive vice president, vice president of financial affairs, vice president of academic affairs, vice president of administrative affairs and vice president of public relations. The general council consists of class presidents, class senators and representatives from various university organizations.

The student government oversees funding to all clubs on campus, approves new club requests, appoints students to various university committees and represents the student body to the administration. USG has its own offices located in the student center. Elections are held in the fall and spring every academic year.

Controversy

Desmond Tutu
In 2007, the president of the University of St. Thomas, Father Dennis Dease, cancelled a planned speech by Nobel Peace Prize laureate and anti-apartheid figure, Desmond Tutu, on the grounds that his presence might offend some members of the local Jewish community. Many faculty members of Voice for Peace led an email campaign calling on St. Thomas to reconsider its decision, which the president did and invited Tutu to campus. Tutu declined the re-invitation, speaking instead at the Minneapolis Convention Center at an event hosted by Metropolitan State University. However, he addressed the issue two days later while making his final appearance at Metro State.

Demolition of Foley Theater
In 2008, plans were announced to the public that the theater department at the University of St. Thomas was to be dissolved and that the school would no longer offer this major. Declining numbers of theater majors was publicly cited as the reason. However, during this same time, plans were underway to make space for a new student center to be named after the Anderson family, then the largest single donors to a single private institution in United States history. Despite protests from senior faculty and students, the decision was made to demolish the theater and dissolve the department the same semester; though, according to the Dean of St. Thomas's College of Arts and Sciences, Marisa Kelly, the two decisions were "completely unrelated".

Notable faculty and staff

John Abraham – professor in the School of Engineering
Michael Murphy Andregg – geneticist and peace activist
Archbishop William Brady
Don J. Briel – Professor of Catholic Studies
Glenn Caruso – head football coach
Bishop Andrew H. Cozzens – Professor of Divinity
Robert Delahunty – internationally recognized professor of law
David Durenberger – U.S. Senator from Minnesota
Massimo Faggioli – theology professor
Father Michael Joncas - professor of Catholic Studies
Ellen J. Kennedy – genocide scholar
John Jeremiah Lawler – Professor of Divinity
Nekima Levy-Pounds – President of the Minneapolis NAACP
Whitney MacMillan – former Chairman of the Board and Chief Executive Officer of Cargill
Eugene McCarthy – U.S. Senator and Representative
Eoin McKiernan – early scholar in Irish Studies
Harry Mehre – football and basketball coach
Thomas Mengler – Dean of the School of Law
Larry Miggins – baseball coach
Leslie Adrienne Miller – poet
Charles Morerod – Director of the Rome Program in Catholic Studies
Rachel Paulose – Visiting Professor of Law
Mary Rose O'Reilley – poet
Mark Osler – Professor of Law
Bishop Lee A. Piché – theology
David Renz – Professor of Public Policy
John A. Ryan – moral theologian 
Patrick J. Schiltz – U.S. federal judge
Katarina Schuth – Professor for the Social Scientific Study of Religion 
Janet E. Smith – moral theologian
Brandon Staley - Head Coach of the Los Angeles Chargers
David Strom – Professor of Political Philosophy
Peter Vaill – Professor of Management
Robert Vischer – Dean of the School of Law

Notable alumni

Academia and education
Tim Callahan – geologist
Dennis Dease – former President of the University of St. Thomas
Richard DeMillo – computer scientist
Mark Dienhart – educator
Tom Dooher – president of Education Minnesota
Abraham Kaplan – philosopher
Rick Krueger – educator 
Stephen A. McCarthy – director of the Cornell University libraries
John A. Ryan – theologian
Edward J. Walsh – journalist

Arts and entertainment
Felix Biederman – writer, gamer, co-host of Chapo Trap House
Larry Bond – game designer and author
Dottie Cannon – Miss Minnesota USA 2006
Vince Flynn – author
T. R. Knight – actor
Glenn Lindgren – TV chef and food writer
Thomas Melchior – author 
T.D. Mischke – radio talk show host
Evan Schwartz – author
Ali Selim – film director
Joe Soucheray – radio talk show host
John Vachon – photographer

Athletics
Adrian Baril – professional football player
Brady Beeson – professional football player
Jim Brandt – professional football player
Herb Franta – professional football player
Courtney George – professional curler
Tommy Gibbons – Hall of Fame boxer, sheriff of Ramsey County, Minnesota 1934–1959
Neal Guggemos – professional football player
Red Hardy – professional baseball player 
Walt Kiesling – professional football player and coach, member of the Pro Football Hall of Fame
John Kundla – first coach for the Minneapolis Lakers
Horace LaBissoniere – professional football player  
Jake Mauer – professional baseball player and coach
Chuck Reichow – professional football player
Isaac Rosefelt – American-Israeli basketball player
Don Simensen – football player
Larry Steinbach – football player
Roy Vassau – professional football player
Joe Warren – professional soccer player

Business and leadership
Ben Anderson – entrepreneur
Robert Buss – managing director, Disciplined Growth Investors
Jack Casey – business professional
Andrew Cecere – Chief Executive Officer of U.S. Bancorp
Ron Fowler – owner, San Diego Padres
John Schneider – general manager of the Seattle Seahawks
Bob Short – businessman, sport teams owner and politician
Ann Winblad – venture capitalist

Law, politics, government, and military
Semhar Araia – social activist 
James N. Azim, Jr. – Wisconsin State Assemblyman
Mike Beard – member, Minnesota House of Representatives
William V. Belanger, Jr. – Minnesota State Senator
Michelle Benson – Minnesota State Senator
David H. Bieter – mayor of Boise, Idaho
John E. Boland – member, Minnesota House of Representatives
Stephen F. Burkard – attorney
Michael Ciresi – attorney
Ted Daley – Minnesota State Senator
Gary DeCramer – Minnesota State Senator
Terry Dempsey – member, Minnesota House of Representatives
Joe Dunn – California State Senator
Sondra Erickson – member, Minnesota House of Representatives
Peter Fischer – member, Minnesota House of Representatives
Burke Harr – Nebraska State Senator
John Harrington – chief of metro transit police in Minneapolis/St. Paul
Brian H. Hook – former Assistant Secretary of State for International Organization Affairs
Paul Kohls – member, Minnesota House of Representatives
Charles B. Kornmann – United States federal judge
Arthur Lenroot, Jr. – Wisconsin State Senator
Patrick Lucey – Governor of Wisconsin 
Erin Maye Quade – member, Minnesota House of Representatives  
Mike McFadden – 2014 Republican candidate for U.S. Senate from Minnesota
Pam Myhra – member, Minnesota House of Representatives 
Jim Oberstar – former U.S. Congressman
James Hugh O'Neill – brigadier general, U.S. Army
Cindy Pugh – member, Minnesota House of Representatives
Patrick J. Ryan – chief of chaplains of the U.S. Army
Henry Timothy ("Tim") Vakoc – first U.S. military chaplain to die from wounds received in the Iraq War
Conrado Vega – Minnesota State Senator
D.D. Wozniak – former chief judge of the Minnesota Court of Appeals

Religion
 Bishop Joseph John Annabring
 William Henry Bullock
 James Joseph Byrne – Archdiocese of Dubuque
 Bishop Frederick F. Campbell
 Archbishop. Robert J. Carlson – Archdiocese of St. Louis
 Bishop Peter F. Christensen
 Bishop Leonard Philip Cowley
 Archbishop Blase J. Cardinal Cupich – Archdiocese of Chicago
 John Francis Doerfler
 Paul Vincent Dudley
 Archbishop Paul D. Etienne
 Lawrence Alexander Glenn
 David Haas
 Hilary Baumann Hacker
 Lambert Anthony Hoch
 Edward Howard
 James Keane
 Francis Martin Kelly
 Bishop Arthur Kennedy
 Bishop John Francis Kinney
 Louis Benedict Kucera
 Raymond W. Lessard
 Bishop John M. LeVoir
 Raymond Alphonse Lucker
 Bishop Lawrence James McNamara
 John Jeremiah McRaith
 William Theodore Mulloy
 Gerald Francis O'Keefe
 Bishop Richard Pates
 Bishop Lee A. Piché
 Archbishop John Roach – Archdiocese of St. Paul and Minneapolis
 Archbishop Alexander King Sample – Archdiocese of Portland
 Francis Joseph Schenk
 Alphonse James Schladweiler
 Archbishop Fulton J. Sheen – titular see of Newport, Wales
 George Henry Speltz
 Rose Thering – social activist
 Sylvester William Treinen
 Nicolas Eugene Walsh
 Thomas Anthony Welch
 Stephen S. Woznicki

Other
Dan Buettner – explorer, educator, author
Daerek "LemonNation" Hart – professional League of Legends player
Hussein Samatar – politician, banker, and community organizer
Will Steger – polar explorer

See also

 List of colleges and universities in Minnesota
 Higher education in Minnesota

Notes

References

 https://www.twincities.com/2021/09/23/former-st-thomas-campus-gop-chair-pleads-not-guilty-in-sex-trafficking-case/
 https://apnews.com/article/arrests-cdb6e1763c98489a1a86f9caee512084

Bibliography

External links

Official website
Official athletics website

 
Saint Thomas, University of
Association of Catholic Colleges and Universities
Universities and colleges in Minneapolis
Universities and colleges in Saint Paul, Minnesota
1885 establishments in Minnesota
Catholic universities and colleges in Minnesota
Liberal arts colleges in Minnesota